The University of Glamorgan Students' Union (Glam SU) was the students' union at the University of Glamorgan, primarily based at the university's Treforest campus.. It was known under the letters UGU. The union was an affiliate of National Union of Students of the United Kingdom and part of NUS Wales. It offered representation, support and services to all the students of the University.

Facilities
The new Students' Union at Trefforest has many facilities and services:-
 The Randy Dragon Inn- serves food,  Games machines, pool tables offers pub quizzes and other events. The Inn has a pub atmosphere and can hold 200 people.
 Cables- feeder bar to the main venue, holds 200 people
 The Basement- 800 capacity venue (Trefforest campus)
 Reflections
 Shop - A large sized shop on campus stocking newspapers, magazines, sandwiches, alcohol, snacks, clothes, groceries and more.
 Reception - Offering NUS Card issuing, tickets for events, photocopying, faxing and more
 Box office
 Social learning Space
 Hair dressers
 Job shop
 Student letting agency
 Beauty shop.
 Business enterprise
 Meeting room for students, officers and can be booked for university staff or conferences
 Terrace
 Escape bar (ATRiuM Campus)
 Glyntaff desk and shop

Entertainment
This is a typical week for entertainments within the union:-
 Sunday - Pub Quiz (Treforest & Atrium)
 Monday - 
 Tuesday - Comedy Night / Open Decks Night / beerkeller / Zeus (Cardiff)
 Wednesday - Score!
 Thursday - Anything Goes from Karaoke to School Discos/ alternative nights
 Friday - Flirt
 Saturday - Hedkandi - House (Treforest)

The Students' Union new Student Union building in Treforest opened on 10 September 2010.

TAG (Treforest. ATRiuM & glyntaff)
TAG is the new student newspaper for the university. It is published 5 or 6 times a year and is run by student volunteers elected each year.

RAG
RAG stands for Raising and Giving for all Universities, however the university has put a slight twist to the name 'Raising at Glamorgan'. The group runs events and other fundraising activities to raise money for local and national charities. It is run by students and headed by an elected RAG Chairperson.

Societies
The student union has many societies which specialise in interest and hobby opportunities for the students.  These societies include:
 GSIS (International Society)
 Games Society
 Film Appreciation Society
 Forensics
 Cheerleading
 Islamic
 Glamorgan University Guide & Scout Society - a society affiliated to SSAGO
 LGBTQ, the university's lesbian, gay, bisexual, transgender and queer society, which holds weekly meets and workshops, mixers with the GSIS society, trips, and campaigning
 Debating Society
 Computer Games Development

Each year, students can start new clubs by contacting the students union.

Sports Teams
The union supports a wide variety of sports teams, who are entered annually into BUCS. These include:
 Men's & Women's hockey
 Men's & Women's Rugby Union
 Men's Rugby League
 Men's & Women's Football
 Cricket
 Netball
Table tennis
Badminton
 And many more

Sports Clubs
The Union also supports many sports clubs including:
 Climbing
 Skiing & Snowboarding
 Swimming & Waterpolo
 And many more.

Each year, students were able to start new clubs by contacting the students union

Past presidents
 1990 / 1992 - Dipak Gohil
 1992/1994 - Lee Whitehead
 1994/1995 - Joanna Welch
 1995/1996 - Sian Roberts
 1996/1997 - Jacqueline Blunden
 1997/1998 - Matthew Kent
 1998/1999 - Paul Cruise
 1999/2000 - Sara Smallbone
 2000/2001 - Matt Whiting
 2001/2002 - Chris Lloyd
 2002/2003 - Kim Brown
 2003/2005 - Phil Rees
 2005/2006 - Richard Ellis
 2006/2008-  Dylan "Davish" Davies
 2008/2009 - Ray Joyce
 2009/2011- Helen Wakeford
 2011/2012 - Daniel Bowen

Standing Committees
Sports 
Cultural 
Union Supported Activities
Women's 
SWD (Students with disabilities)
Black students
LGBT
Postgraduate
Part-time
International
Mature
Housing
Treforest
Glyntaff
Atrium
Welsh Language

Each committee consists of a chair and 4 committee members. Each standing committee must meet a minimum of five times a year according to the standing orders. The committee will discuss any issues and where appropriate suggest policy proposals for the chair of the committee to bring to the student council meeting. 

Each year there should be a minimum of 5 student council meetings although there are often more. At student council only the chairs of the standing committees, one SVR (student voice representative) from each faculty and the executives having speaking and voting rights, unless the chair uses their discretion to allow a student at the council meeting to speak or if it is an enfranchised student who has proposed the policy proposal. Any enfranchised student may propose or second a policy proposal and then speak on their proposal at student council. All policy proposals must have 10 signatures from enfranchised students who agree with the proposal.

Student council rotates meetings between campuses, starting the academic year at Treforest, then to Atrium, then to Glyntaff, to make student council more accessible to students across all three campuses.

Mascot
Gandolf the goat

External links
Glamorgan Union
University of Glamorgan website

Students' Union